Immortal is an original novel based on the U.S. television series Buffy the Vampire Slayer.

Plot summary

Veronique is an immortal vampire that continues to return in the body of a newly dead person every time she has been staked. However, she wants to become truly immortal by summoning an ancient demon called the Triumvirate. And of course her choice spot to do so would be in Sunnydale, especially with the extra magical vibes emanating from the Hellmouth. Unfortunately, while Buffy is trying to keep Veronique's vampire henchmen at bay, she also has to deal with the fact that her mother is sick in the hospital. There's a chance that she has cancer, but they won't know for sure until they've performed surgery on her. Buffy has to decide where she's needed most: with her mother, or to stop the end of the world. Buffy and her friends battle Veronique and the Triumverate with help from Lucy Hanover and other spirits who possess them as the Triumverate need to drain the life-force of nearby souls.  Without being able to do so, they revert into their hatchling forms and are killed.  With them dead, Veronique loses her immortality and is killed by the last of the hatchlings before it dies.

Continuity

Joyce's illness is foreshadowed.
In the UK, this was the first Buffy novel to appear in hardback form.
Supposed to be set in an alternative Buffy Season 3. The book shares continuity with the Gatekeeper trilogy. For example the slayer, Lucy Hanover appears.

Canonical issues

Buffy novels such as this one are not usually considered by fans as canonical. Some fans consider them stories from the imaginations of authors and artists, while other fans consider them as taking place in an alternative fictional reality. However, unlike fan fiction, overviews summarising their story, written early in the writing process, were 'approved' by both Fox and Joss Whedon (or his office), and the books were therefore later published as officially Buffy merchandise.

External links

Reviews
Litefoot1969.bravepages.com - Review of this book by Litefoot
Teen-books.com - Reviews of this book
Nika-summers.com - Review of this book by Nika Summers
Shadowcat.name - Review of this book

1999 novels
Books based on Buffy the Vampire Slayer
American young adult novels